Denny Wang Yi (born 15 April 1998) is a professional footballer currently playing as a right-back for Shanghai Shenhua. Born in Italy, Wang regained Chinese nationality in 2021.

Club career

As a youth player, he joined the youth academy of Juventus.

In March 2021, Wang regained Chinese nationality and signed for Chinese Super League side Shanghai Shenhua.

Career statistics

Club
.

Notes

References

1998 births
Living people
People from Alba, Piedmont
Italian people of Chinese descent
Italian footballers
Italy youth international footballers
Chinese footballers
Association football defenders
Serie D players
Juventus F.C. players
A.C. Carpi players
F.C. Pro Vercelli 1892 players
Shanghai Shenhua F.C. players
Footballers from Piedmont
Sportspeople from the Province of Cuneo